Port Republic may refer to a location in the United States:

 Port Republic, Maryland
 Port Republic, New Jersey
 Port Republic, Virginia
 Battle of Port Republic, American Civil War battle fought in Rockingham County, Virginia